Ameiva parecis is a species of teiid lizard endemic to Brazil.

References

Ameiva
Reptiles described in 2003
Lizards of South America
Reptiles of Brazil
Taxa named by Guarino R. Colli
Taxa named by Daniel O. Mesquita